"Blue Baby Blue" is a song written by Michael Clark. It was recorded by American country music artist Lynn Anderson and released as a single in 1980 via Columbia Records.

Background and release
"Blue Baby Blue" was recorded in April 1980 at the Columbia Recording Studio, located in Nashville, Tennessee. The session was produced by Gary Klein and Charles Koppelman. It was Anderson's first production assignment with both producers after spending many years at the Columbia label working with her first husband, Glenn Sutton.

"Blue Baby Blue" was released as a single in October 1980. The song spent 13 weeks on the Billboard Hot Country Singles chart before reaching the top 40 at number 27 in December 1980. It was Anderson's final single release for Columbia Records. She would leave the label and not return to the charts until 1983 on the Permian label. The song was issued on Anderson's 1980 album Even Cowgirls Get the Blues.

Track listings 
7" vinyl single
 "Blue Baby Blue" – 2:40
 "The Lonely Hearts Cafe" – 3:47

Chart performance

References

1980 singles
1980 songs
Columbia Records singles
Lynn Anderson songs